The Democratic Union for Integration is the largest ethnic Albanian political party in North Macedonia and the third largest political party in the country. It was formed immediately after the country's 2001 armed conflict between the National Liberation Army (NLA) and Macedonian security forces. NLA leader Ali Ahmeti has been the party's president ever since.

History
In the 2002 parliamentary election, the party won 12.1% of the popular vote (70% of the Albanian vote) and 16 of 120 seats.

From 2002 to 2006, it was part of the ruling coalition along with the Social Democratic Union of Macedonia (SDSM) and the Liberal Democratic Party. In the 2006 parliamentary election, the party formed a coalition with the Party for Democratic Prosperity and the Democratic League of Bosniaks. This coalition received 12.2% of the vote and 16 seats. Although DUI won the most seats among ethnic Albanian parties (13), since their governmental partners lost the election, it was not invited by newly elected Prime Minister Nikola Gruevski to participate in the government. Its place was taken by the second-largest ethnic Albanian political party, the Democratic Party of the Albanians. However, after the 2008 early parliamentary election, the party returned to the government in a coalition with Gruevski's VMRO-DPMNE.

In the 2011 parliamentary election, DUI received 10.2% of the total vote, winning 15 seats, a loss of 3 seats from the previous election. DUI had the best election result in the 2014 parliamentary election when it received 153,646 votes (14.2%), winning 19 seats, and had the worst result in the next election in 2016, receiving 86,796 votes (7.5%). In 2016, DUI entered the government in a coalition with SDSM.

In the campaign for the 2020 parliamentary election, DUI made its participation in any coalition contingent on the nominee for Prime Minister being an ethnic Albanian, which both SDSM and VMRO-DPMNE have refused. On 18 August, SDSM and DUI announced that they had reached a deal on a coalition government as well as a compromise on the issue of an ethnic Albanian Prime Minister. Under the deal, SDSM leader Zoran Zaev will be installed as Prime Minister, and will serve in that position no later than 100 days from the next parliamentary elections. At that time, DUI will propose an ethnic Albanian candidate for Prime Minister, and if both parties agree on the candidate, that candidate will serve out the remaining term until the elections.

On World Environment Day in 2021, Ahmeti announced the party will focus more on environmental issues, citing Greta Thunberg's activism as inspiring the party's new direction.

Election results

Parliament

Controversy

Skopje Fortress incident 
After the foundations of a 13th-century church were found by a governmentally funded excavation within the Skopje Fortress complex, the Cultural Heritage Protection Office actioned a project to restore it in the form of a church museum. The DUI requested the government to halt construction in early 2011, which was ignored. Two weeks later, just under a hundred DUI supporters converged on the site on 11 February 2011, among them three high-ranking ethnic Albanian ministers and some damaged part of the scaffolding.

Notes

References

External links 
Democratic Union for Integration

2002 establishments in the Republic of Macedonia
Albanian political parties in North Macedonia
Political parties established in 2002
Political parties of minorities
Pro-European political parties in North Macedonia